Ngodwana Biomass Power Station, also Sappi Ngodwana Biomass Power Station, is a  biomass-fired thermal power plant under development in South Africa. Ngodwana Energy Limited, a South African independent power producer was awarded the concession to design, finance, construct, operate and maintain the power station.

Location
The power plant is under construction in the town of Ngodwana, in Ehlanzeni District, in Mpumalanga Province.

Overview
In April 2018, the engineering, procurement and construction (EPC) contract was awarded to a consortium comprising (a) ELB Engineering Services (Pty) Limited (b) KC Cottrell Company Limited and (c) ELB Educational Trust.

The power station will use bio-waste from the adjacent wood and paper mill to boil water and produce steam. The steam will drive turbines of generate electricity. The waste gases from burning wood will be treated to remove pollutants, contaminants and carcinogens, before release into the atmosphere.

The power generated will be evacuated along a high voltage transmission line to a substation where the power will be integrated into the national power grid. The South African state-owned utility company Eskom, will purchase the power under a long-term power purchase agreement. A biomass storage unit will be constructed as part of this project.

Ownership
The table below illustrates the shareholding in Ngodwana Solar Power Station.

Construction costs and timeline
The total cost for the power plant is estimated at US$89 million. Of that, US$66.75 million (75 percent) will be borrowed from Absa Bank Limited and Nedbank Limited. The remaining US$22.25 million (25 percent) will be raised by the power station owners.

In April 2018, it was estimated that construction would take 27 months from start to commercial commissioning.

The start up of the power plant was in March 2022.

See also

List of power stations in South Africa

References

External links
  Update On 25MWE Biomass Power Plant For Sappi Ngodwana Pulp And Paper Mill As of 12 March 2020.

Economy of Mpumalanga
Biofuel power stations in South Africa
Renewable energy power stations in South Africa